The Trenton Shooting Stars were a professional basketball team in the International Basketball League (IBL) from 1999 to 2001.

History
The team was owned by Herb Greenberg and Larry Keating was the president: Kevin Mackey was named coach and director of basketball operations in May 1999, and the newly opened Sovereign Bank Arena was the home court. During the IBL inaugural draft the Shooting Stars selected the following players: Kevin Ollie, Mark Baker, Shawnelle Scott, Todd Lindeman, Tyrone Grant, James Martin, Willie Simms, Moochie Norris, LaMarr Greer, Ryan Bowen and Cassette Wesson. Mackey resigned on January 19, 2000 citing health issues, and he was replaced by his assistant coach John Carideo, who stayed as the head coach until the end of the 2000–01 season. In the first IBL season the team finished with a 32–32 record: Ray Tutt was the leading scorer with 19.4 points per game, while Tyrone Grant led the team in rebounds with 8.8 and Ryan Lorthridge was the assist leader with 8 per game. Lorthridge was also the league assist leader. The Shooting Stars qualified for the playoffs, finishing second in the East Division behind the Cincinnati Stuff, but lost in the first round of the playoffs to the Richmond Rhythm.

In the second season, the team finished with an improved record of 27–25 (.519) and again qualified for the playoffs: they defeated the Cincinnati Stuff in the first round, but lost in the second round to the Grand Rapids Hoops. For the second year in a row, Ryan Lorthridge led the IBL in assists with 8.6 per game. The franchise ceased operations after the IBL folded in 2001.

Season-by-season records

All-time roster

Larry Abney
Lloyd Daniels
Nick Davis
Dell Demps
Shane Drisdom
Dennis Edwards
Tyrone Grant
LaMarr Greer
Jermaine Guice
Deon Hames
Greg Harris
Kermit Holmes
Antoine Hyman
Mike Jones
Michael-Hakim Jordan
Garth Joseph
Ray Kelly
Kirk King
Mike Lloyd
Ryan Lorthridge
Michael Maddox
Gabe Muoneke
Damian Owens
Frantz Pierre-Louis
George Reese
Antonio Reynolds Dean
Terrance Roberson
Marvin Rodgers
Richard Mason Rocca
Ray Tutt
K'Zell Wesson
Duane Woodward
Stephen Worthy
Alvin Young

Awards
All-IBL First team: Ryan Lorthridge (2000), Ray Tutt (2001)
All-IBL Second team: Ray Tutt (2000)

References

External links
INTERNATIONAL BASKETBALL LEAGUE HISTORY on apbr.org

Defunct basketball teams in the United States
Basketball teams in New Jersey
International Basketball League (1999–2001) teams
Sports in Trenton, New Jersey